Swargaputhri is a 1973 Indian Malayalam-language film, directed and produced by P. Subramaniam. The film stars Madhu, Vijayasree, Thikkurissy Sukumaran Nair and Muthukulam Raghavan Pillai. The film had musical score by G. Devarajan.

Cast

Madhu as Babu
Vijayasree as Lissy
Thikkurissy Sukumaran Nair as Mathai
Muthukulam Raghavan Pillai as Poulose
Nilambur Balan as Pappachan
Raghavan as Doctor
Adoor Pankajam as Mariyakutty
Bahadoor as Kunjali
KPAC Sunny as Thampi
Kottarakkara Sreedharan Nair as Thomas
S. P. Pillai as Hospital Warden
Sujatha as Thampi's Wife

Soundtrack
The music was composed by G. Devarajan and the lyrics were written by Sreekumaran Thampi.

References

External links
 

1973 films
1970s Malayalam-language films
Films directed by P. Subramaniam